The Arab Unified Club Championship Final, also known as the 2003 Prince Faisal bin Fahd Tournament for Arab Clubs Final, was the 19th final of the UAFA Club Cup, and the second since the Arab Club Champions Cup and the Arab Cup Winners' Cup were unified. The match took place on 20 July 2003, at Cairo Stadium in Cairo, Egypt, between Zamalek from Egypt, and Kuwait SC from Kuwait, Zamalek won the match 2–1 and earning their first (and only) UAFA Club Cup title.

Match details

References 
 http://www.angelfire.com/ak/EgyptianSports/ZamalekARAB2003.html
 http://almustaqbal.com/storiesv4.aspx?storyid=20258
 https://web.archive.org/web/20050211074156/http://www.ahram.org.eg/archive/2003/7/21/SPOR8.HTM

Final
2003
UAFA
Kuwait SC matches
2003–04 in Kuwaiti football
2003–04 in Egyptian football